Heidi Ruud Ellingsen (born 26 July 1985) is a Norwegian actress and musical artist.

On the stage, she has among others played the lead roles of Singin' in the Rain, Mary Poppins, Tonje Glimmerdal and Flashdance as well as Solveig in Peer Gynt at Gålå. On the screen, she had a role in the NRK series Hjem in 2012–2013. She also presented the Melodi Grand Prix 2019 show together with Kåre Magnus Bergh.

In a relationship with Mads Ousdal, she bore their first child in 2016.

References

1985 births
Living people
People from Narvik
Norwegian stage actresses